Zhongchun Road is a station on Shanghai Metro Line 9. It began operation on December 29, 2007.  It is located in Qibao Town at Shanghai-Songjiang Highway and Zhongchun Road. It is the last station before entering Songjiang District.

The station has 3 tracks, one island platform, and one side platform. The inner island platform is not in service. Trains heading to Caolu use the outer island platform, whilst trains towards Songjiang South Railway Station use the side platform. This station utilizes the same platform layout as Guilin Road on the same line.

Station Layout 

Railway stations in Shanghai
Shanghai Metro stations in Minhang District
Railway stations in China opened in 2007
Line 9, Shanghai Metro